The Radomysl uezd was one of the subdivisions of the Kiev Governorate of the Russian Empire. It was situated in the northern part of the governorate. Its administrative centre was Radomyshl. It included the city of Chernobyl which later became the seat of its own Raion after the uyezd was liquidated in 1923, but before that was the seat of Chornobylsky Uyezd which existed from 1919 to 1923.

Demographics
At the time of the Russian Empire Census of 1897, Radomyslsky Uyezd had a population of 315,629. Of these, 78.4% spoke Ukrainian, 13.1% Yiddish, 3.9% Russian, 2.3% German, 1.9% Polish and 0.4% Czech as their native language.

References

 
Uezds of Kiev Governorate
1796 establishments in the Russian Empire
1923 disestablishments in Ukraine